The Missouri Pacific Railway Van Noy Eating House is a historic restaurant building at the corner of Seamans Drive and Railroad Street in McGehee, Arkansas.  The single story brick building was constructed c. 1910 by the Missouri Pacific Railroad, and housed a dining establishment operated by the Van Noy Railway News and Hotel Company.  It is one of a small number of such buildings to survive in the state.  The building was divided into three parts: a central kitchen served a lunch counter area on one side, and a dining room on the other.  The establishment closed in 1948.

The house was listed on the National Register of Historic Places in 2011.

See also
National Register of Historic Places listings in Desha County, Arkansas

References

Commercial buildings on the National Register of Historic Places in Arkansas
Commercial buildings completed in 1910
Buildings and structures in Desha County, Arkansas
National Register of Historic Places in Desha County, Arkansas
1910 establishments in Arkansas